Damian Łukasik (born 26 February 1964) is a Polish football manager and former football defender.

Honours

Lech Poznań
 Ekstraklasa: 1982/83, 1983/84, 1989/90, 1992/93.
 Polish Cup: 1983/84, 1987/88.

References

External links

1964 births
Living people
Polish footballers
Lech Poznań players
Ruch Chorzów players
Hapoel Tel Aviv F.C. players
Dyskobolia Grodzisk Wielkopolski players
Association football defenders
Polish expatriate footballers
Expatriate footballers in Israel
Polish expatriate sportspeople in Israel
Poland international footballers
Polish football managers